Adozelesin is an experimental antitumor drug of the duocarmycin class. It binds to and alkylates DNA, resulting in a reduction of both cellular and simian virus 40 (SV40) DNA replication which ultimately reduces the rate of cancer growth.

References

Experimental cancer drugs
Cyclopropanes